Chandrapur College, established in 1986, is a general degree college in Chandrapur in Purba Bardhaman district. It offers undergraduate courses in arts, science and commerce. It is affiliated to University of Burdwan.

Departments

Science

Mathematics

Arts and Commerce

Bengali
English
History
Geography
Philosophy
Sanskrit
Political Science
Education
Economics
Physical Education
Mass Communication & Journalism
Commerce

Accreditation
The college is recognized by the University Grants Commission (UGC). And National Assessment and Accreditation Council(NAAC) accredited B

See also

References

External links
Chandrapur College

Colleges affiliated to University of Burdwan
Educational institutions established in 1986
Universities and colleges in Purba Bardhaman district
1986 establishments in West Bengal